Simon Hatzl is an Austrian TV, fim and stage actor.

Life
Born in Eibiswald, he studied at the Max-Reinhardt-Seminar in Vienna and graduated in 1998. He has appeared as part of the Vienna's Theater der Jugend (Youth Theatre) as well as in Kommissar Rex and Mein Mörder. He was nominated for a Nestroy in 2001 for his appearance in Bester Nachwuchs.

Filmography

Film 
 1998: Wie eine schwarze Möwe
 2003: Wolfzeit
 2004: Mein Mörder
 2004: Shadow of the Sword – Der Henker
 2006: Fallen
 2007: Freigesprochen
 2008: Das große Glück sozusagen
 2008: Der erste Tag (TV film)
 2009: Rimini
 2010: Meine Tochter nicht (TV film)
 2010: The Unintentional Kidnapping of Mrs. Elfriede Ott
 2010: Mahler on the Couch
 2010: Spuren des Bösen (TV film)
 2011: Das Wunder von Kärnten (TV film)
 2012: Europas letzter Sommer (TV film)
 2013: Nicht ohne meinen Enkel (TV film)
 2013: Die Werkstürmer
 2014: CopStories
 2014: Sarajevo
 2014: Gruber geht
 2015: Die Toten vom Bodensee – Familiengeheimnis (TV film)
 2015: Landkrimi – Wenn du wüsstest, wie schön es hier ist
 2016: Agonie
 2016: Pokerface – Oma zockt sie alle ab
 since 2016: Die Toten von Salzburg (TV series) 
 2016: Die Toten von Salzburg
 2018: Zeugenmord
 2018: Königsmord
 2019: Mordwasser
 2019: Wolf im Schafspelz
 2017: Tatort – Wehrlos
 2018: Landkrimi – Achterbahn
 2018: Landkrimi – Grenzland
 2019: Wilsberg – Minus 196°
 2019: Unter anderen Umständen – Im finstern Tal
 2019: Vienna Blood
 2020: The Trouble with Being Born

TV 
 2001: Kommissar Rex (episode 7x07 Besessen)
 2002: Medicopter 117 – Jedes Leben zählt (2 episodes)
 2002: Dolce Vita & Co (episode 2x02 Die Prüfung)
 2003–2020: SOKO Kitzbühel (6 episodes)
 2004: Tatort – Tod unter der Orgel
 2005: Die Patriarchin (episode 1x01 I)
 2005: Schloss Orth (episode 9x08 Einbrüche)
 2006: 8x45 – Austria Mystery (episode 1x03 Das Eis bricht)
 2005–2016: SOKO Wien (4 episodes)
 2006: Der Winzerkönig (3 episodes)
 2007: Vier Frauen und ein Todesfall (episode 2x02 Rattengift)
 2012: Die Bergretter (episode 3x03 Steinschlag)
 2012–2014: Schnell ermittelt (2 episodes)
 2013: Janus (episode 1x02)
 2014: Die Detektive (episode 1x07)
 2014: Universum History (documentary series, 1 episode)

External links 
 IMDB entry
  Profil on ORF-Kundendienst
  Profil on Max-Reinhardt-Seminar
  Simon Hatzl - agent's profile

References

Austrian actors
1973 births
Living people
20th-century Austrian male actors
21st-century Austrian male actors
Austrian male film actors
Austrian male television actors
Austrian male stage actors
People from Deutschlandsberg District